Mat Kerekes (born April 22, 1994) is an American singer and songwriter, best known as the lead vocalist of rock band Citizen, of which he is a founding member. He is also a solo artist and a member of The Flats.

Biography
Kerekes was born and grew up in the Bedford Township area of Michigan, and attended Bedford High School. Before Citizen, Kerekes was the drummer of a metalcore band called The Sound of Glory at the age of 14. They had a large local following as well as somewhat of a regional following during their years of existence. This band included members of Citizen Nick Hamm and Eric Hamm on their same respective instruments. Additional members of the band were vocalist Josh Childress (guitarist of The Plot in You and a second guitarist to The Sound of Glory, Joey Chester. Kerekes formed the band Citizen shortly after the breakup of The Sound of Glory and stuck with a melodic hardcore sound in their early self-released material. Citizen played their first show on January 28, 2010 at Frankie's Inner City in Toledo, Ohio where they opened for Set Your Goals. They have released four studio albums and two EPs. Additionally, he has been an active member of his brother Chris Kerekes's band The Flats, playing drums and occasionally contributing vocals.

Kerekes has also released solo music online since 2011. In 2014 he released a six-song self-titled LP, and in 2016 released a full solo studio album, Luna & The Wild Blue Everything. He wrote and performed everything on this record with the exception of some percussion, which was done by producer Will Yip, and the violin. He released his album, Nova, on August 5th, 2022. He named this album after the two places he has considered his home base, Northern Ohio and Virginia, where he currently resides with his wife, Shay Kerekes. 

Kerekes has cited Third Eye Blind among his greatest musical influences.

Kerekes follows a straight edge lifestyle. He is an advocate of animal rescues and has used his music before for fundraising efforts, specifically Toledo's PET Bull Project. He owns two pit bulls.

Discography

Citizen
 The Only Place I Know (split with The Fragile Season) (2011)
 Young States (2011)
 Citizen / Turnover (split with Turnover) (2012)
 Youth (2013)
 Everybody Is Going to Heaven (2015)
 As You Please (2017)
 Life in Your Glass World (2021)

The Flats
 Liberation & The House in Blue (2014)
 Auburn in the Everlast (2017)
 Nobody People (2018)

Solo
 Mat Kerekes (2014)
 2011–2014 (2015)
 Luna & The Wild Blue Everything (2016)
 Ruby (2019)
 Amber Park (2020)
 Songs For Breanne (2020)
 Nova (2022)

Appears on
 "No Maps" - Two Cities (Little Ghosts, 2012)
 "My Love" - Marzek (Only up from Here, 2015)
 "Midwest Towns" - Red Foreman (The Universe Doesn't Give a Shit About You, 2017)

References

External links
 Official Mat Kerekes website
 Official The Flats Bandcamp page
 Official Citizen website
 Official Run For Cover Records website

1994 births
American rock singers
Singers from Michigan
Living people
People from Toledo, Ohio
21st-century American singers
21st-century American male singers